is a Japanese jidaigeki or period drama that was broadcast in prime-time in 1984. It is also known as "A Samurai's Sorrow." It is based on Goseki Kojima and Kazuo Koike's manga of the same title. The lead star is Masakazu Tamura. Masakazu Tamura's elder brother Takahiro Tamura and younger brother Ryo Tamura also appeared. Three special editions of the drama were produced. Masakazu Tamura played the role on stage.

Plot
Kainage Mondo is a secret child of Tokugawa Yoshimune and is a skilled swordsman. His job is a part to test food for poison for Yoshimune. He was on a journey but he goes to Edo to see Yoshimune.

The Owari han have longed for the post of shogun and try to murder Yoshimune, in order to get shogun's post. Fuki is a kunoichi of Kōka. She tries to murder Yoshimue but she comes to like Mondo and eventually starts working for Mondo and Yoshimune. Mondo protects Yoshimune's life from Owari han and other enemies.

Cast
Masakazu Tamura as Kainage Mondo
Takahiro Tamura as Tokugawa Yoshimune
Ryo Tamura as Ōoka Tadasuke
Tsutomu Isobe as Tokugawa Muneharu
Kantarō Suga as Manabe Akifusa
 Junshi Shimada as Mizuno Izuminokami
 Junkichi Orimoto
 Goichi Yamada
 Yōsuke Kondō as Head of Owari Yagyū
Kie Nakai as Fuki (Fukiko)

Episode list

TV Specials
Odokumiyaku Shushou Kawaite sōrō (June 17, 1983) Directed by Yuichi Harada, Guest starrings, Kimie Shingyoji, Jih Nakayama
Kawaite sōrō Odokumiyaku Hissatsuken (January 26, 1984) Directed by Yuichi Harada, Guest starrings, Tatsuo Umemiya, Kantarō Suga, Jin Nakayama
Kawaite sōrō Hahawa Ikiteita? (April 7, 1993) Directed by Akira Inoue, Guest starrings, Kaoru Yachigusa, Kimiko Ikegami, Hirotaro Honda, Hiroyuki Nagato

On the Stage 
Kawaite sōrō (乾いて候)（1987-1993）
Shin Kawaite sōrō Sonatamo Onaji Nonohanaka (新・乾いて候 そなたもおなじ野の花か)（2003, 2005）

References

1984 Japanese television series debuts
1980s drama television series
Jidaigeki television series
Cultural depictions of Tokugawa Yoshimune
Television series set in the 17th century
Japanese television dramas based on manga